Claxton, Tennessee may refer to one of two locations:

Claxton, Anderson County, Tennessee
Claxton, McMinn County, Tennessee